Bograxie is a farm in Aberdeenshire, Scotland.

References

Buildings and structures in Aberdeenshire